Dhatrigram is a census town in Kalna I CD Block in Kalna subdivision of Purba Bardhaman district in the state of West Bengal, India.

History
Dhatrigram responded warmly to the movement against partition of Bengal in 1905. Many people in the town had close links with Kolkata and the liberal trend then affecting the metropolis flowed into this small town for many years.

Geography

Location
Dhatrigram is located on the agriculturally rich alluvial plains between the Bhagirathi, Ajay and Damodar rivers. Temperatures in this region varies from 17-18 °C in winter to 30-42  °C in summer.

Urbanisation
87.00% of the population of Kalna subdivision live in the rural areas. Only 13.00% of the population live in the urban areas. The map alongside presents some of the notable locations in the subdivision. All places marked in the map are linked in the larger full screen map.

Demographics
As per the 2011 Census of India Dhatrigram had a total population of 9,951, of which 5,137 (52%) were males and 4,814 (48%) were females. Population below 6 years was 826. The total number of literates in Dhatrigram was 7,704 (84.43% of the population over 6 years).

 India census, Dhatrigram had a population of 9,609. Males constitute 52% of the population and females 48%. Dhatrigram has an average literacy rate of 68%, higher than the national average of 59.5%: male literacy is 76% and, female literacy is 60%. In Dhatrigram, 11% of the population is under 6 years of age.

Economy
It is a weaving centre with a name for cotton and silk saris.

About 32,00,000 people commute daily from around the city to Kolkata. Thirty-eight trains transport commuters from 45 stations in the Howrah-Katwa section.

Infrastructure
As per the District Census Handbook 2011, Dhatrigram covered an area of 2.6 km2. It had 1.2 km roads. Amongst the medical facilities, the nearest nursing home was 7 km away and the nearest veterinary hospital was 7 km away. It had 2 primary schools. The nearest secondary  school was 1.5 km away at Gram Kalna  and the nearest senior secondary school was 13 km away at Kalna.

Transport
Dhatrigram railway station is 91 km from Howrah and situated on the Bandel-Katwa Branch Line.

Education
Dhatrigram has many primary and two higher secondary schools
 Dhatrigram High School
 Dhatrigram Balika Vidyalaya
 Gramkalna High School.

Culture
Saraswati & Jagatdhatri Puja  is celebrated in Dhatigram and  many cultural programmes are held during this occasion.

External links
 Map of Bardhaman district

References

Cities and towns in Purba Bardhaman district